Pierre Jean Marcel Claret (1 July 1911 – 27 September 1981) was a French ice hockey player. He competed in the men's tournament at the 1936 Winter Olympics. During World War II, he was imprisoned in both the Buchenwald and Mittelbau-Dora concentration camps.

References

1911 births
1981 deaths
Ice hockey players at the 1936 Winter Olympics
Olympic ice hockey players of France
People from Chamonix
Sportspeople from Haute-Savoie